Raio Piiroja (born 11 July 1979) is an Estonian former professional footballer. He played as a centre-back for Pärnu/Kalev, Lelle, Flora, Vålerenga, Fredrikstad, Vitesse and Chengdu Blades.

Piiroja made his international debut for the Estonia national team on 21 November 1998 in a friendly against Armenia. He was team captain from 2008 to 2011, and made a total of 113 appearances for Estonia before retiring in 2013. On 31 March 2015, Piiroja made his 114th and final appearance for Estonia in his testimonial match against Iceland.

Known for his leadership and ability in the air, Piiroja was named Estonian Footballer of the Year five times, in 2002, 2006, 2007, 2008 and 2009.

Club career

Early career
Piiroja started playing football with his hometown club Rivaal, before moving to Pärnu. He made his Meistriliiga debut on 16 July 1995, five days after his 16th birthday, against Eesti Põlevkivi in the opening match of the season. 10 days later, on 26 July 1995, Piiroja scored his first goal in the Meistriliiga in a 4–2 defeat against Narva Trans and became the youngest goalscorer in Meistriliiga history at the age of 16 years and 15 days.

Flora
In 1996, Piiroja joined Lelle, a team affiliated with Flora. He played for Lelle from 1997 until 1999, when he was promoted to Flora's first team. With Flora, Piiroja won his first Meistriliiga title in the 2001 season. He won his second consecutive Meistriliiga title in the 2002 season and was named Estonian Player of the Year for the first time.

Vålerenga (loan)
In 2003, Piiroja joined Norwegian Tippeligaen side Vålerenga on loan.

Fredrikstad
In August 2004, Piiroja signed a contract with Tippeligaen side Fredrikstad. On 12 November 2006, he scored twice in the 2006 Norwegian Football Cup Final against  Sandefjord as Fredrikstad won 3–0. In 2007, Piiroja extended his contract for four more years. During his time with Fredrikstad, Piiroja won four consecutive Estonian Player of the Year awards, in 2006, 2007, 2008 and 2009. Fredrikstad finished the 2009 season in 14th place and were relegated from the Tippeligaen after a 2–0 loss against Sarpsborg 08 in the play-offs. Fredrikstad returned to the Norwegian top division after a season, with Piiroja scoring in both legs of an 8–1 aggregate win against Hønefoss in the promotion play-offs.

Vitesse
On 31 August 2011, Piiroja signed a one-year contract, with an option of extension for another season, at Eredivisie side Vitesse.

Chengdu Blades
On 18 February 2013, Piiroja signed for China League One team Chengdu Blades.

International career
Piiroja made his international debut for the Estonia national team on 21 November 1998, in a 2–1 loss against Armenia in a friendly, replacing Viktor Alonen in the 85th minute of the match. Piiroja soon established himself as Estonia's first choice centre-back. In 2008, he succeeded Martin Reim as team captain. On 25 March 2011, Piiroja made his 100th appearance in a 2–0 win over Uruguay in a friendly. He was sent off by referee Viktor Kassai in the 76th minute of the first leg of the UEFA Euro 2012 qualifying play-off against Republic of Ireland, which Estonia went on to lose 5–1 on aggregate. Piiroja ended his international career in October 2013, but made one final appearance for Estonia on 31 March 2015, in his testimonial match against Iceland. He made a total of 114 appearances and scored 8 goals.

Personal life
Piiroja married his long-time girlfriend Marje in 2005. They divorced in 2015. Outside of football, Piiroja enjoys skiing and is an avid fisherman.

On 1 June 2016, Piiroja released his autobiography, Ninamees Raio Piiroja, õhuvõitleja, written by sports journalist Gunnar Press.

Career statistics

Club

International

Scores and results list Estonia's goal tally first, score column indicates score after each Piiroja goal.

Honours
Flora
Meistriliiga: 2001, 2002
Estonian Supercup: 2002

Fredrikstad
Norwegian Cup: 2006

Individual
Estonian Footballer of the Year: 2002, 2006, 2007, 2008, 2009
 Order of the White Star, 5th Class

See also
 List of men's footballers with 100 or more international caps

References

External links

 
 

1979 births
Living people
Sportspeople from Pärnu
Association football defenders
Estonian footballers
Estonia international footballers
FC Flora players
Meistriliiga players
Vålerenga Fotball players
Fredrikstad FK players
SBV Vitesse players
Estonian expatriate footballers
Expatriate footballers in Norway
Estonian expatriate sportspeople in Norway
Eliteserien players
Eredivisie players
FIFA Century Club
Chengdu Tiancheng F.C. players
China League One players
Estonian expatriate sportspeople in the Netherlands
Expatriate footballers in the Netherlands
Estonian expatriate sportspeople in China
Expatriate footballers in China
Recipients of the Order of the White Star, 5th Class
JK Tervis Pärnu players